Matthew Joseph Festa (born March 11, 1993) is an American professional baseball pitcher for the Seattle Mariners of Major League Baseball (MLB). He made his MLB debut in 2018.

Early life
Festa was born in Brooklyn, New York, and raised in the Bulls Head and Great Kills sections of Staten Island, New York. He grew up a fan of the New York Yankees, idolizing Mariano Rivera and Derek Jeter. Festa attended St. Joseph by the Sea High School, graduating in 2011. He is close friends with actor and comedian Pete Davidson, as the two were high school classmates together.

College
He enrolled at Dominican College, where he played college baseball for the Dominican Chargers for one year, and transferred to East Stroudsburg University of Pennsylvania, where he played college baseball for the East Stroudsburg Warriors for three years.

Career
The Seattle Mariners selected him in the seventh round, with the 207th overall selection, of the 2016 MLB draft.

In 2016, Festa pitched for the Everett AquaSox of the Low-A Northwest League, posting a 6–2 win–loss record with a 3.73 earned run average (ERA) in 14 games (eight starts). Festa pitched for the Modesto Nuts of the High-A California League in 2017, where he went 4–2 with a 3.23 ERA with 99 strikeouts in  innings pitched, and appeared in the league's all-star game. In 2018, the Mariners invited Festa to spring training. He began the regular season with the Arkansas Travelers of the Double-A Texas League, and the Mariners promoted him to the major leagues on July 14. He made his major league debut that day.

Festa made the Mariners' Opening Day roster in 2019. Festa was sent down to the Tacoma Rainiers of the Triple-A Pacific Coast League multiple times during the season, ending his 2019 season with just 20 appearances for Seattle. On February 3, 2020, Festa was designated for assignment and outrighted to Tacoma on February 10. On March 5, 2020, Festa underwent Tommy John surgery, ending his 2020 season before it began. He returned to action in August 2021 for Tacoma, and pitched  innings of 2.95 ERA ball for the team, also appearing in four rehab games with the High-A Everett AquaSox and AZL Mariners.

The Mariners invited Festa to spring training as a non-roster player in 2022. Starting in the 2022 season, Festa decided to go by his full first name of Matthew instead of his abbreviated name Matt. On April 7, the Mariners selected Festa's contract, adding him to their Opening Day roster.

International career; Team Italy 
In November 2022, Festa committed to play for Team Italy in the 2023 World Baseball Classic in Miami starting March 11–15. He will be playing for Team Italy manager and hall of famer Mike Piazza, and alongside All Star outfielder Brandon Nimmo.

References

External links

Living people
1993 births
Sportspeople from Staten Island
Baseball players from New York City
American people of Italian descent
American people of Polish descent
Major League Baseball pitchers
Seattle Mariners players
Dominican Chargers baseball players
East Stroudsburg Warriors baseball players
Everett AquaSox players
Modesto Nuts players
Arkansas Travelers players
Tacoma Rainiers players
Peoria Javelinas players
Arizona Complex League Mariners players
People from Great Kills, Staten Island
2023 World Baseball Classic players